Sverre Lie (8 January 1888 – 13 January 1983) was a Norwegian footballer. He played in one match for the Norway national football team in 1908.

References

External links
 

1888 births
1983 deaths
Norwegian footballers
Norway international footballers
Place of birth missing
Association footballers not categorized by position